Jiang Fangzhou (born October 27, 1989, in the city of Xiangyang, in Hubei province) is a Chinese infant prodigy author. She graduated from Tsinghua University in 2012 and is the author of nine books, among which Unlatched the Window onto the Paradise is her prose works published when she was 9 and was later adapted for a comic book; and We are Growing is her first novel published in September 2001 and in November its traditional Chinese edition appeared in Taiwan; and Preadolescence in May 2002; Look over Here in October 2002; I am an Animal a long fairy tale in October, 2003, was later adapted for a stage play; The True Story of the Mischievous Child, a column, began to appear both in The Beijing News and Southern Metropolis Daily in November, 2003, was formally published in October 2004; The Rainbow Rider in July 2006; Number One Schoolgirl in July 2007, and Features of Rumors in January 2009.

References

Living people
1989 births
People's Republic of China writers